"(It's a) Long Lonely Highway" is a song written by Doc Pomus and Mort Shuman and originally recorded and released by Elvis Presley. It reached number 44 in francophone Belgium in 1965.

Composition 
The song was written by Doc Pomus and Mort Shuman.

Recording and release 
Elvis Presley recorded the song on May 27, 1963, at RCA's Studio B, Nashville. The recording session featured Grady Martin, Harold Bradley, Jerry Kennedy and Scotty Moore on guitar, Bob Moore on bass, and D. J. Fontana and Buddy Harman on drums, Floyd Cramer on piano, and Boots Randolph on saxophone, vibes and shakers. Additional vocals were provided by Millie Kirkham and The Jordanaires.

This song was intended for a 1963 studio album, but the album was abandoned. So the song was eventually included as a bonus on the Kissin' Cousins soundtrack album released in April 1964, becoming its highlight and helping it sell 300,000 copies.

On August 10, 1965, an alternate take (recorded on the same say as the album version) was released as the B-side to "I'm Yours".

Track listing

Charts

References

External links 
 
 I'm Yours / (It's a) Long Lonely Highway on the Elvis Presley official website

1965 songs
1965 singles
Elvis Presley songs
Songs with lyrics by Doc Pomus
Songs with music by Mort Shuman